Loyola High School is a private, Roman Catholic, college-preparatory high school for boys in Los Angeles, California, United States. It was established in 1865 and is part of the Society of Jesus. It is the oldest continuously run educational institution in Southern California.

History 

Loyola High School of Los Angeles is the region's oldest continuing educational institution pre-dating both the Los Angeles public school and the University of California systems.  The school began in the downtown plaza Lugo adobe in 1865 as Saint Vincent's College at the behest of Archdiocese of Los Angeles Bishop Thaddeus Amat.  After relocating to Hill Street in 1869 and to Grand Avenue in 1889, the Vincentian fathers ceded control of the school to the Society of Jesus in 1911, and it relocated to Avenue 52 in Highland Park as the prep school Los Angeles College.  In 1917 the school moved to its current location on Venice Boulevard after the copper magnate and Irish philanthropist Thomas P. Higgins helped secure land for the school.

The college was renamed Loyola College the following year, in honor of St. Ignatius of Loyola, the founder of the Society of Jesus. Until 1929, the campus housed the college, the law school, and the high school. At that time, the Jesuits purchased additional property to house the college and separate facilities were acquired for Loyola Law School just west of downtown Los Angeles. The college, now Loyola Marymount University, was moved to the area now known as Westchester in West Los Angeles.

Recent campus development of the school occurred in the 1980s: the gym, track, and swimming pool, along with additional classroom space, were built after the administration secured major donations.  A $30 million renovation with donations from the William Hannon Foundation, the Ardolf Family, and others have provided for a new science building, counseling and student centers, additional classrooms, and central plaza, which were operational as of June 2007, when construction of a new Xavier Center was begun. Hannon Theatre on campus with its large stage serves the students along with actors from throughout Southern California.

Profile

Admissions 
The primary admissions entry point for Loyola High School is in 9th grade, with varying transfer opportunities offered in 10th and 11th grades. Transfer is not allowed going into the senior year, except for rare situations.  Admission is based on standardized test scores; recommendations from the candidate's teachers, principal, and minister; involvement in extracurricular activities; a personal statement; and grades.

Loyola draws its students from throughout the greater Los Angeles area, from Pacific Palisades to East L.A., from Pasadena to San Pedro, from the South Bay as well as the San Fernando, San Gabriel, Santa Clarita, and Hidden Valleys.  Nearly 50% of the student body is composed of individuals of African-American, Latino, and Asian heritages, which serves to enhance the ethnic and socio-economic diversity of the school.

Approximately 800 students apply for 310 slots in the freshman class each year.

Curriculum 
Four years each of social studies and English studies courses are required, along with three years of foreign language study and of science, and one year of fine art.  Eight semesters of theology are also a central part of the curriculum, covering Holy Scripture, systematic theology, Catholic social thought, moral theology, and one senior elective.  Advanced Placement courses are offered in 25 subject areas with a historical "pass" rate of almost 80%, and students are encouraged to take a wide variety of electives outside of the required courses. Loyola also offers more than 19 Honors courses. Ninety-six percent of Loyola graduates attend a four-year college.

In 2014, Loyola sent 23 students to USC which has an 18% acceptance rate: the Loyola contingent was the most from any school.

In 2017, among 153 private high schools in the  Los Angeles metro area, Niche ranked Loyola 13th in college readiness, and among 52 Catholic high schools 2nd overall with an A+ grade. Also, according to Niche, Loyola is the best all boy school.

Service 

Since the 1970s, Loyola students have performed over one million hours of service to the community.  As part of its commitment to educating men for and with others, Loyola students participate in four major service-oriented projects during their high school careers. The freshman serve as tutors on the Loyola campus for the award-winning High School Placement Test Prep Projects for 8th (October - January) and 7th graders (February - April), as well as assist with the Special Olympics. The second and third service projects include minimum 25-hour service projects during each of the sophomore and junior years.  The Senior Service Project is a minimum 85-hour immersion commitment to a non-profit service organization in January of senior year. Inner city grade schools, special education schools, hospitals, hospices, shelters, and soup kitchens are preferred sites for this service experience. Now in its 29th year, the Senior Service Project was featured in "Making A Difference" as part of the NBC National News hosted by Brian Williams on March 11, 2010. The film clip is accessible on the Loyola and NBC websites.  Loyola students' community service has been regularly featured on the local news programs of the ABC affiliate, Channel 7, including Kool Kids and a fundraising car wash conducted on behalf of Homeboy Industries in Los Angeles, the gang member reformation program founded by Greg Boyle, a Loyola graduate and former faculty member.

Loyola sponsors one of the leading Community Service fairs in metro Los Angeles during the third week of September each year with over 100 local agencies, centers, schools, and organizations sending representatives to enroll Loyola students as volunteers. This event supports all of the school's service and justice education programs and seeks to support better-informed choices for service by the students.

Several times over the course of the year, the Cubs Urban Plunge in Los Angeles is offered to students and faculty as a way for them to better experience the community from the position of the poor, disenfranchised, and marginalized. This is one of Loyola's distinguishing programs. Still the only high school in Los Angeles, public or private, to offer such a program, through this three- to four-day program, students serve in a number of shelters and centers on Skid row, Hollywood, and East Los Angeles. This program continued through the summer of 2010 with four urban plunges being offered. An overview of the Cubs Urban Plunge program may be found in the July edition of the "Beverly Press."

Starting in June 2007, Loyola began an out-of-area, hands-on service program with a two-week service immersion in New Orleans.  The 2008 program took Loyola students to Appalachia, focused in Wheeling and Charleston, West Virginia.  In July 2008 Loyola launched its foreign service immersion in Puebla and Cholula, Mexico.  In June 2009, Loyola launched a  five-week, academic exchange and service immersion with Colegio Del Salvador, the Jesuit high school in Buenos Aires, Argentina.  The 2009 summer service immersion program included student, faculty, and staff service teams in New Orleans/Slidell, Louisiana, in mid June and another student, staff, alumni, and parent service team to Lima and Cusco, Peru, in late July and early August. The 2010 service immersion program included one that is agriculturally based in the Salinas Valley in Northern California and an extended urban immersion in Los Angeles, both conducted in mid-June. In 2010 Loyola again conducted a six-week Argentina Intercambio program based in Buenos Aires, expanded to include nine days in metropolitan Montevideo, Uruguay.  The Intercambio is conducted in conjunction with the Jesuit colegios in Buenos Aires, Argentina, and in Santa Fe, Montevideo, Uruguay. An overview of the summer service immersion program may be found in the July 31, 2010, edition of The Tidings, the weekly newspaper of the Archdiocese of Los Angeles.

Overall, each Loyola student completes a minimum of 150 hours of direct service by graduation with many of them matriculating with between 250 – 300 hours. Non-credit service activities include the annual Community Service Fair conducted each September, the Community Service Leadership Team, the annual AIDS Walk Los Angeles, the Peace and Justice Coalition, the annual School of the America's Watch and Ignatian Teach-In conducted just before Thanksgiving, Catholic Lobby Day in Sacramento, California, an annual social justice speakers series, and ongoing collection of food, clothing, books, and toys for distribution to the needy served by some of the school's 1,000 placement partners. Service and justice are two significant factors considered in making the most of the "Big Seven" awards for graduating seniors each June. Outstanding service leadership is recognized at the annual student awards ceremony and the Annual Community Service Awards Banquet held each May.

Loyola is an active member of the Ignatian Solidarity Network (ISN), an association of 70 US Jesuit high schools, colleges, and universities engaged in social advocacy and justice education for students and adults. National and regional topical workshops included Loyola's hosting 500 students and adults from the US and Mexico for the 2008 ISN conference on comprehensive immigration reform.  In years past, Loyola delegations have participated in national conferences on racism and poverty in New Orleans (2007) and comprehensive immigration advocacy in Washington, DC (2009).  The 2010 ISN program occurred in Washington, DC, and focused on immigration, the environment, health care, and education.

Loyola parent, alumni, faculty, and staff involvement in various service projects with students is a distinguishing characteristic of the Loyola program. Parents and alumni are heavily involved in staffing the Saturday tutoring programs for 8th graders and 7th graders each Fall and Spring. In December 2008 and again in October 2009, the whole Loyola faculty, staff, and administration spent the better part of a retreat day serving in the same agencies and schools as their students.

Loyola's service program has received numerous awards from the City of Los Angeles, the County of Los Angeles, the Catholic Archdiocese of Los Angeles, the California State Senate, and a number of various agency and civic groups for the million plus hours of student service contributed to the children, men, and women of Los Angeles.

Athletics 
Loyola High School has a strong history of athletics success, including national championships in football and volleyball. Loyola has won at least one California Interscholastic Federation (CIF) title for ten years running, and won their tenth CIF Commissioner's Cup in 2022. In the 2002-2003 academic year, Loyola set the California state record for most section championships (5) won in a single school year: cross-country, basketball, volleyball, track, and golf. The Cubs matched their still-standing state record in the 2015-2016 school year, winning section titles in golf, lacrosse, swimming, volleyball, and soccer.

 Baseball: CIF Champs - 1954, 2007 Mission League Champs - 1996, 2005, 2013, 2014
 Basketball: CIF AAAA/Div I-A Champs - 1953, 2002, 2003, 2011
 Cross Country: Mission League Champs - 1994 through 2018; CIF Champs - 1984, 1985, 2002, 2004, 2007; CIF State Champs - 2002, 2004, 2007, 2008, 2010, 2015; Nike Cross Nationals - 2007 (8th in U.S.), 2008 (15th in U.S.)
 Football: CIF AAAA/Div I Champs - 1962, 1963, 1975, 1990, 2003, 2005; National Champs - 1975 (National Sports News Service)
 Golf: CIF Div Champs - 2000, 2001, 2003, 2005, 2016, 2017, 2019, 2022
 Lacrosse: CIF Certification - 2006; Mission League Champs - 2007, 2009; Division II champions - 2011, Division I champions - 2016, 2017, 2018; CIF Southern Section Champions - 2021 
 Soccer: CIF Division I/Division II Champs - 1998, 2005, 2007, 2014, 2016 State Champs, Nationally ranked 24th, ranked 7th in the state 
 Swimming/Diving: CIF Champs - 1984, 1994, 1996, 1997, 2011 (State Champs, 4th in U.S.), 2016 2019
 Tennis: CIF Champs Div 1-A - 1980, 2-A - 1982, 1984, 1986 
 Track & Field: CIF Champs - 1984, 2000, 2003, 2004, 2008, 2009, 2010, 2011, 2012, 2013; National Champs - 2011 (Nike Track Nationals)
 Volleyball: CIF Div I Champs - 1983, 1985, 1986, 1987, 1988, 1995, 2003, 2004, 2005, 2009, 2010, 2016; National Champs - 2009 (ESPN RISE) CIF Div 1 STATE Champs - 2009, 2010 & 2012
 Water Polo: Mission League Champs - 2008, 2009, 2010, 2011, 2012, 2017

Top All-Boys Athletic Program in the nation as ranked by ESPN RISE: 2008, 2009, 2010, 2011

Loyola's football team competes in the highly competitive Serra League.  The team achieved a particularly successful 2011-2012 campaign by notching 8 wins. During the 2015-16 season, the Cubs ended the regular season 8-2, including a perfect 7-0 on the road. This record led them to their first CIF Division 1 playoff appearance since 2011. They eventually lost in the second round to nationally ranked St. John Bosco, finishing the season with a 9-3 record and ranked in the Top 15 football programs in the state of California.

Notable alumni

References

External links 
 

Pico-Union, Los Angeles
High schools in Los Angeles
Roman Catholic secondary schools in Los Angeles County, California
Boys' schools in California
Catholic preparatory schools in California
Catholic secondary schools in California
Jesuit high schools in the United States
Educational institutions established in 1865
1865 establishments in California